Wrestling competitions at the 2022 Commonwealth Games in Birmingham, England, were held on 5 and 6 August 2022. The sport was one of six original sports at the Games and was all editions except 1998 and 2006 (the third time within England specifically), spread across twelve weight categories in the freestyle discipline.

Schedule
The competition schedule was as follows:

Venue
The wrestling competitions were held at the Coventry Arena in Coventry. The judo competitions also took place there, whilst the adjacent Coventry Stadium was host to rugby sevens.

Medal summary

Medalists

Men's freestyle

Women's freestyle

Participating nations
There were 26 participating Commonwealth Games Associations (CGA's) in wrestling with a total of 119 (73 men and 46 women) athletes. The number of athletes a nation entered is in parentheses beside the name of the country.

References

External links
Official website: 2022 Commonwealth Games – Wrestling

 
2022
2022 Commonwealth Games events
International wrestling competitions hosted by the United Kingdom
2022 in sport wrestling